The Chief of the Defence Staff is the highest-ranked officer in the Rwanda Defence Force.

Chief of Staff of the Rwandan Army

Chief of Defence Staff of the Rwandan Patriotic Army/Rwanda Defense Force

References 

Army chiefs of staff
Military of Rwanda